State Fair Community College is a public community college in Sedalia, Missouri, adjacent to the Missouri State Fairgrounds.  In addition to the Sedalia campus, there are extended campus locations in Boonville, Lake of the Ozarks, Clinton, Warsaw, and Whiteman AFB. The school enrolled 4,284 students in 2019.

History
State Fair Community College is part of the Junior College District of Sedalia, which was established on April 5, 1966, to serve 14 counties in west central Missouri.  However, due to a lawsuit regarding the legality of community college districts in Missouri, that was not resolved until 1967 by the Missouri Supreme Court, the college's opening was delayed until Sept. 16, 1968.  The college's name was  selected by President Fred Davis and the Board of Trustees from names submitted by local residents to the board, with the winner being a submission from a local area high school student.

The campus opened with one building – a 35,000-square-foot facility with six modular units connected by a central hallway.

Presidents of the college have been Fred Davis (1925-2013; 1967-1984), Marvin Fielding (1984-1997), Stephen Poort (1997-2003), Marsha Drennon (2003-2013), and Joanna Anderson, (2013–2022).

Over the years SFCC has added new programs such as Engineering, Sustainable Agriculture, Renewable Energy in Biomass, Wind, and Solar energy, online courses, and dual-credit courses at 28 high school locations. Additionally, SFCC has residence halls at the Sedalia campus dormitories to better serve students.

The college has received ongoing accreditation by The Higher Learning Commission of the North Central Association of Colleges and Schools.  In spring 2005 SFCC was admitted as an Academic Quality Improvement Program institution by HLC/NCA. Today the college offers more than 30 programs.

The Daum
The college's campus is home to The Daum Museum of Contemporary Art, which was constructed in 2002 to house the collection of local investor Harold F. Daum.  The museum is noted as being part of a mini-boom of local art museums being constructed in Missouri.  The museum cost approximately 2.6 million dollars, and has  of exhibition space  designed by Brian Smith.

Notable alumni
Joe Thomasson (born 1993), basketball player in the Israel Basketball Premier League

References

External links

 

Two-year colleges in the United States
Educational institutions established in 1966
Buildings and structures in Pettis County, Missouri
Community colleges in Missouri
Education in Pettis County, Missouri
1966 establishments in Missouri
NJCAA athletics